WXML (90.1 FM) is a radio station broadcasting a Christian radio format. Licensed to Upper Sandusky, Ohio, United States, the station serves the Mid-Ohio area.  The station is currently owned by Kayser Broadcast Ministries and features programming from AP Radio.

History
The station went on the air as WXML on 1990-10-03.  On 1990-11-15, the station changed its call sign to WVZX, and on 1991-11-22 to the current WXML,

References

External links

XML